4th Man Out is a 2015 American comedy film directed by Andrew Nackman and written by Aaron Dancik. The film stars Evan Todd as Adam, a young man living in Upstate New York who, on his 24th birthday, comes out as gay to his best friends Chris (Parker Young), Nick (Chord Overstreet), and Ortu (Jon Gabrus).

The film premiered on May 26, 2015, at the Inside Out Film and Video Festival, and had a limited release in the United States on February 5, 2016. The film received the audience award for Best Dramatic Feature Film at Outfest, along with the audience award for Best Narrative Feature at the InsideOut LGBT Film Festival in 2015.

Plot
Adam is an average working-class young man living in small-town America. He's an auto mechanic who spends his free time with his tight-knit band of bros, Chris, Nick and Ortu, with whom he does everything — poker, video games, shooting hoops, getting drunk and meeting women. But there is something about Adam that even his friends don't know. On his 24th birthday, Adam struggles to come out as gay to his three best friends. Unable to reveal his secret, Adam goes with his friends to a failed night out at a bar, where Chris drunkenly flirts with a girl before the four friends make a quick exit to avoid a bar fight. The next morning, Adam manages to come out before quickly leaving to avoid any awkwardness. Comedy ensues as Adam's three best friends struggle to come to terms with their friend's sexuality, worried that his coming out might somehow change the nature of their relationships. Fourth Man Out is a feel-good buddy comedy with plenty of heart that focuses on the growing pains and ultimate strengths of friendship.

Cast

Reception
The film received mixed to positive reviews from critics. The review aggregator website Rotten Tomatoes reported that 58% of critics gave the film a positive rating, based on 12 reviews, with an average score of 4.9/10. On Metacritic, which uses a normalized rating system, the film holds a 43/100 rating, based on seven reviews, indicating "generally mixed or average reviews".

References

External links
 
 
 4th Man Out at Fearless

2010s buddy comedy films
2015 LGBT-related films
2015 films
American buddy comedy films
American LGBT-related films
Films set in New York (state)
Films shot in New York (state)
Gay-related films
LGBT-related buddy comedy films
2010s English-language films
2010s American films